Glinek is a small settlement south of Škofljica in central Slovenia. The entire Municipality of Škofljica is part of the traditional region of Lower Carniola. It is included in the Central Slovenia Statistical Region.

Name
Glinek was attested in historical sources as Glunk  1330 and Glynikg in 1439, among other spellings.

References

External links

Glinek on Geopedia

Populated places in the Municipality of Škofljica